Aceria pseudoplatani causes the sycamore felt gall that is found on the leaves of sycamores (Acer pseudoplatanus) or Norway maple (Acer platanoides), and is caused by an acarine gall-mite.

Appearance
The gall forms a bulge on the upper epidermis where the pigment colour is usually light yellow to start with and brown later on in the year. The appearance on the lower epidermis is a concavity with cream or white coloured felt-like mat which later turns brown. The bulge is due to the erinae or hairs being wider at their top. In purple-leaved varieties of the sycamore the patches are pink. The size of the felt-like patches is variable and they may appear from late spring onwards.

Distribution
The sycamore felt gall is quite common and is widespread through the United Kingdom and is also recorded from Poland, Belgium and Germany.

References

Notes;

Sources;
Darlington, Arnold (1975). Plant Galls in Colour. Poole : Blandford Press. .
Hancy, Rex (2000). The Study of Plant Galls in Norfolk. The Norfolk & Norwich Naturalists' Society.
Redfern, Margaret & Shirley, Peter (2002). British Plant Galls. Identification of Galls on Plants and Fungi.'' Shrewsbury : FSC Publications. .

Arachnids of Europe
Eriophyidae
Animals described in 1905